The 22157 / 22158 Mumbai–Chennai Mail is a train belonging to Indian Railways – Central Railway zone that runs between Mumbai Chhatrapati Shivaji Maharaj Terminus &  in India.

It operates as train number 22157 from Mumbai Chhatrapati Shivaji Maharaj Terminus to Chennai Egmore and as train number 22158 in the reverse direction, serving the states of Maharashtra, Karnataka, Telangana, Andhra Pradesh & Tamil Nadu.

Coach composition

The train consists of:
 1 AC Two Tier 
 4 AC Three Tier coaches
 9 Sleeper Class
 2 General Unreserved
 2 Sitting cum Luggage Rakes

Service 

Routeing 

Traction
As the entire Chennai-Mumbai line is electrified, this train is hauled end to end by a Royapuram based WAP-7.

Operation 

It runs on a daily basis.

Rake sharing

It shares its rakes with 22153/22154 Chennai Egmore-Salem Superfast Express.

Gallery 

 Dedicated Intercity trains of India
 Lokmanya Tilak Terminus–Chennai Central Weekly Express

References

External links 
 Mumbai Chennai Mail
 Chennai Mumbai Mail
 
 

Transport in Mumbai
Transport in Chennai
Express trains in India
Rail transport in Maharashtra
Rail transport in Karnataka
Rail transport in Andhra Pradesh
Rail transport in Telangana
Rail transport in Tamil Nadu
Mail trains in India